Herbert Keyshawn Jones (born October 6, 1998) is an American professional basketball player for the New Orleans Pelicans of the National Basketball Association (NBA). He played college basketball for the Alabama Crimson Tide. He earned third-team All-American honors as a senior in 2021, when he was also named the SEC Player of the Year.

High school career
Jones started playing varsity basketball as a seventh-grader for Sunshine High School in Newbern, Alabama, where his father served as the head coach. He played alongside his older brother, Walter Jr., and helped his team reach the Class 1A state finals in 2015, before the school closed. For his junior season, Jones transferred to Hale County High School in nearby Moundville, Alabama, following his father, who was an assistant coach. As a senior, he averaged 16.6 points, 8.2 rebounds and four assists, earning Class 4A Player of the Year honors. Jones led Hale County to the 4A state championship, its first-ever state title. He committed to playing college basketball for Alabama over offers from Auburn, Georgia, Georgia Tech and Florida.

College career
As a freshman at Alabama, Jones averaged 4.2 points and 3.5 rebounds per game. He drew a single-season program record 23 charges. In his sophomore season, he averaged 6.4 points and 3.5 rebounds per game. On January 29, 2020, during a game against LSU, Jones suffered a fractured left wrist and underwent surgery three days later. He returned to action on February 12 while wearing a cast on his wrist. In his next game, after three days, Jones recorded six points and 17 rebounds in an 88–82 win over LSU. Late in the game, he made two free throws using only his right hand, due to his injury. As a junior, Jones averaged 7.9 points, 6.4 rebounds and 2.3 assists per game and was a Southeastern Conference (SEC) All-Defensive Team selection. He declared for the 2020 NBA draft before withdrawing and returning to college.

At the close of the 2020–21 regular season, Jones was named the SEC Player of the Year and Defensive Player of the Year by the league's coaches. As a senior, he averaged 11.2 points, 6.6 rebounds, 3.3 assists, 1.7 steals and 1.1 blocks per game. On April 8, 2021, Jones declared for the 2021 NBA draft, forgoing his extra year of college eligibility.

Professional career
Jones was selected in the second round of the 2021 NBA draft with the 35th pick by the New Orleans Pelicans. On December 28, 2021, Jones scored a career-high 26 points in a 108–104 win against the Cleveland Cavaliers. On March 27, 2022, he had a career-high six steals in a 116–108 win over the Los Angeles Lakers.

Career statistics

NBA

Regular season

|-
| style="text-align:left;"| 
| style="text-align:left;"| New Orleans
| 78 || 69 || 29.9 || .476 || .337 || .840 || 3.8 || 2.1 || 1.7 || .8 || 9.5
|- class="sortbottom"
| style="text-align:center;" colspan="2"| Career
| 78 || 69 || 29.9 || .476 || .337 || .840 || 3.8 || 2.1 || 1.7 || .8 || 9.5

Playoffs

|-
| style="text-align:left;"|2022
| style="text-align:left;"|New Orleans
| 6 || 6 || 37.7 || .477 || .417 || .773 || 3.3 || 1.8 || 1.8 || .8 || 10.7
|- class="sortbottom"
| style="text-align:center;" colspan="2"|Career
| 6 || 6 || 37.7 || .477 || .417 || .773 || 3.3 || 1.8 || 1.8 || .8 || 10.7

College

|-
| style="text-align:left;"| 2017–18
| style="text-align:left;"| Alabama
| 35 || 13 || 21.2 || .408 || .269 || .500 || 3.5 || 1.4 || 1.3 || .6 || 4.2
|-
| style="text-align:left;"| 2018–19
| style="text-align:left; "| Alabama
| 34 || 29 || 21.1 || .422 || .286 || .495 || 3.5 || 2.0 || 0.9 || 0.6 || 6.4
|-
| style="text-align:left;"| 2019–20
| style="text-align:left; "| Alabama
| 27 || 26 || 26.5 || .484 || .071 || .625 || 6.4 || 2.3 || 1.3 || 0.7 || 7.9
|-
| style="text-align:left;"| 2020–21
| style="text-align:left; "| Alabama
| 33 || 33 || 27.3 || .446 || .351 || .713 || 6.6 || 3.3 || 1.7 || 1.1 || 11.2
|- class="sortbottom"
| style="text-align:center;" colspan="2"| Career
| 129 || 101 || 23.8 || .441 || .288 || .604 || 4.9 || 2.2 || 1.3 || .8 || 7.3

Personal life
Jones is the son of Walter Sr. and Verlander Jones. He was born with hemolytic anemia. His older brother, Walter Jr., played college basketball for Texas–Rio Grande Valley and Alabama A&M.

References

External links
Alabama Crimson Tide bio

1998 births
Living people
Alabama Crimson Tide men's basketball players
All-American college men's basketball players
American men's basketball players
Basketball players from Alabama
New Orleans Pelicans draft picks
New Orleans Pelicans players
People from Greensboro, Alabama
People from Northport, Alabama
Shooting guards
Small forwards